Josep Graells Esquius (born 1 February 1964) is an Andorran Olympic middle-distance runner. He represented his country in the men's 1500 meters and the men's 800 meters at the 1988 Summer Olympics. His time was a 1:53.34 in the 800, and a 3:52.68 in the 1500 heats.

Notes

References

External links 
 
 

1964 births
Living people
Andorran male middle-distance runners
Olympic athletes of Andorra
Athletes (track and field) at the 1988 Summer Olympics